Al-Najaf or An-Najaf al-Ashraf, Baniqia, is a city in central Iraq about 160 km (100 mi) south of Baghdad. Its estimated population in 2013 was 1,000,000 people. It is the capital of Najaf Governorate. It is widely considered amongst the holiest cities of Shia Islam and one of its spiritual capitals, whilst also remaining the center of Shia political power in Iraq. It is reputedly the burial place of Muhammad's son in law and cousin, Imam ‘Alī ibn Abī Tālib. It is also the location of the largest cemetery in the world, Wadi-us-Salaam, of one of the most important seminaries  in the Shi'i Islamic world, and a major pilgrimage destination for Shia Muslims.

Name 
According to Ibn al-Manzur, the word, "najaf", literally means a high and rectangular place around which water is accumulated, although the water does not go above its level. Al-Shaykh al-Saduq appeals to a hadith from Imam al-Sadiq (a), claiming that "Najaf" comes from the phrase, "nay jaff" which means "the nay sea has dried" which gradually changed into "Najaf".

"Najaf" is usually accompanied with the adjective, "al-Ashraf" (dignified). According to the author of al-Hawza al-'ilmiyya fi l-Najaf al-ashraf, this is because Imam 'Ali (a), one of the most dignified persons, is buried in the city.

Other Names 
Al-Ghari or al-Ghariyyan, Hadd al-'Adhra', al-Hiwar, al-Judi, Wadi l-Salam, al-Zahr, Zahr al-Kufa (behind Kufa), al-Rabwa, Baniqiya, and Mashhad are other names for this land.

History
The area of An-Najaf is located 30 km (19 mi) south of the ancient city of Babylon, and 400 km (248 mi) north of the ancient city of Ur. The city itself was founded in 791 [AD], by the Abbasid Caliph Harūn ar-Rashīd, as a shrine to ‘Alī bin Abī Ṭālib.

Prehistoric and ancient times

Archaeological discoveries show the existence of a populace dating back to the 1st century BC. Najaf possesses one of the largest burial grounds in the vicinity for Christians. The centuries following have proven this to also be a city with a multicultural and religious people. Mohammed al-Mayali, director of Inspectorate Effects of the province of Najaf, states "the excavation on the graves, which we have been working on for years, confirm that "Najaf" contains the largest Christian cemetery in Iraq, with a cemetery area of 1416 acres. We have found indications of Christianity on the graves through representations of crosses and stones with Christ-like engravings. There are also relics that date back to the Sassanid period. Also discovered in the excavation was proof of a thriving glass industry. Pots were decorated with the cross. as well as Hebrew writings, indicating a community of religious coexistence."

Wadi-us-Salaam in Najaf was a holy cemetery for Jewish and was Najaf called at that time Baniqia, and could be this is the first name of Najaf area.

 
The name Baniqia also was found in some texts which tell that in one day Abraham visited this village and stayed couple of days, then he continued in his journey from Mesopotamia to Arabia.

In Islam, the city is considered to have started with Hazrat Ali who instructed that his burial place should remain a secret, as he had many enemies and he feared that his body might be subjected to some indignity. According to legend, the body of Ali was placed on a camel which was driven from Kufah. The camel stopped a few miles west of the city where the body was secretly buried. No tomb was raised and nobody knew of the burial place except for a few trusted people. It is narrated that more than a hundred years later the Abbasid Caliph, Harun al-Rashid, went deer hunting outside Kufah, and the deer sought sanctuary at a place where the hounds would not pursue it. On inquiry as to why the place was a sanctuary Harūn ar-Rashīd, he was told that it was the burial place of ‘Ali. Harūn ar-Rashīd ordered a mausoleum to be built on the spot and in due course the town of Najaf grew around the mausoleum.

Medieval and modern history

In early 14th century Sheikh Ibn Battuta visited the burial site of Ali ibn Abi Talib during his travels in Iraq after his pilgrimage to Mecca. During this period Najaf was called Meshhed Ali. As Translated by Samuel Lee, Ibn Battuta in his Arabic Rihla relates:

In the 16th century, Najaf was conquered by the Ottoman Empire. The Safavid dynasty of Iran maintained continuous interest to this Shia site. During the Ottoman–Safavid War (1623–1639), they were twice able to capture the city, but lost it again to the Ottomans in 1638.

Under the rule of the Ottoman Empire, Najaf experienced severe difficulties as the result of repeated raids by Arab desert tribes and the Persian army with acute water shortages causing lack of a reliable water supply. The number of inhabited houses in the city had plummeted from 3,000 to just 30 by the start of the 16th century.

When the Portuguese traveller Pedro Texeira passed through Najaf in 1604, he found the city in ruins, inhabited by little more than 500 people. This was largely the result of a change in the course of the Euphrates river eastwards in the direction of Hilla, leaving Najaf and Kufa high and dry, leading to the destruction of the local formerly rich agriculture, demise of the palm groves and orchards, followed by the salinization of the underground water due to evaporation.

During the 18th century the scholarly life of Najaf came to be dominated by Farsi-speaking ‘Ulema’ (Scholars) from Iran.

The water shortages were finally resolved in 1803 when the Euphrates made its way to the city once again. The shift in the river's flow was the product of a century-long effort by the Ottomans to shift the flow of the river, so as to deprive marsh-dwelling tribes like the Khaza'il of the watery environment that allowed them to evade state control. These long-term efforts rendered successful the construction of the Hindiyya Canal in 1793, which further shifted the flow of the Euphrates. These hydrological shifts were to have religious implications. Most notable was the consolidation and spread of Shi'ism. As the shrine city of Najaf gained access to water again, its notables and holy men began to wield considerable power in the area. In 1811, the last city wall was rebuilt.

The Ottomans were expelled in an uprising in 1915, following which the city fell under the rule of the British Empire. The sheikhs of Najaf rebelled in 1918, killing the British governor of the city, Sayyed Mahdi Al-Awadi, and cutting off grain supplies to the Anazzah, a tribe allied with the British. In retaliation the British besieged the city and cut off its water supply. The rebellion was put down and the rule of the sheikhs was forcibly ended. A great number of the Shi‘i ‘Ulema’ were expelled into Persia, where they set the foundations for the rise of the city of Qom as the center of the Shi‘ite learning and authority, in lieu of Najaf. Najaf lost its religious primacy to Qom, and was not to regain it until the 21st century, during the establishment of a Shī‘ī-majority government in Iraq after 2003.

In the 20th century, much of the Old City was rebuilt in a series of modernization initiatives. Beginning in the 1950s, many historic buildings and monuments, including those adjoining the shrine, were demolished for the construction of Sadeq, Zainulabidin, Rasool and Tousi streets. In 1958, the city wall was torn down and replaced with a ring road. In the 1980s, the entire area between the shrine and the city's western edge was demolished, and the residents resettled outside the city, in what locals perceived as a government reprisal for the Shia uprising under the leadership of Muhammad Baqir al-Sadr, who was based in the neighborhood.

Post-Baathist period
During the 2003 invasion of Iraq, Najaf was a key target of the invading United States Forces. The city was encircled during heavy fighting on 26 March 2003 and was captured on 3 April 2003 (Battle of Najaf).

The clerical authorities of the Shī‘ī enclave of Sadr City in Baghdad, which claimed autonomy in April 2003, after the fall of Baghdad, claimed to be taking their orders from senior clerics in Najaf.

On 4 April 2004, the Mahdi Army attacked the Spanish-Salvadoran-ALARNG base (Camp Golf, later renamed Camp Baker) in An Najaf, part of a coordinated uprising across central and southern Iraq in an apparent attempt to seize control of the country ahead of the 30 June 2004 handover of power to a new Iraqi government. This uprising led to the American troops arriving in the city in the wake of the Spanish withdrawal. In August 2004, heavy fighting broke out again between US forces and Al-Sadr's Mahdi Army. The battle lasted three weeks and ended when senior Iraqi cleric Grand Ayatollah Ali al-Sistani negotiated an end to the fighting.

The fall of the Baathist regime ended restrictions on Shi'ite pilgrimage, which led to a pilgrimage boom in Najaf and increased demand for facilities and infrastructure. In 2006, the government sponsored redevelopment of the previously demolished western area of the city as the City of Pilgrims project.

In 2012 Najaf was named the Cultural Centre of the Arab World.

On 6 March 2021, Pope Francis visited the city during his historic papal visit to Iraq and held an interfaith dialogue with al-Sistani, where he expressed a message of peaceful coexistence between Muslims and Christians in the country.

Religious significance

An-Najaf is considered sacred by Shi'a Muslims. An-Najaf is renowned as the site of the burial place of Muhammad's son in law and cousin, Imam ‘Alī ibn Abī Tālib. The city is now a center of pilgrimage throughout the Shi'ite Islamic world. It is estimated that only Mecca and Medina receive more Muslim pilgrims. As the burial site of one of the Shi'a Islam's most important figure, the Imam Ali Mosque is considered by Shiites as the third holiest Islamic site.{{refn|<ref>Iraqi forces in Najaf take cover in important Shia shrine, The Boston Globe, April 2, 2003. "For the world's nearly 120 million Muslim Shiites, Najaf is the third holiest city behind Mecca and Medina in Saudi Arabia."</ref>}}

The Imam ‘Ali Mosque is housed in a grand structure with a gold gilded dome and many precious objects in the walls. Nearby is the Wadi-us-Salaam cemetery, the largest in the world. It contains the tombs of several prophets and many of the devout from around the world aspire to be buried there, to be raised from the dead with Imām ‘Alī on Judgement Day. Over the centuries, numerous hospices, schools, libraries and convents were built around the shrine to make the city the center of Shīʻa learning and theology.

The An-Najaf seminary is one of the most important teaching centres in the Islamic world. Ayatollah Khomeini lectured there from 1964 to 1978.
Many of the leading figures of the new Islamic movement that emerged in Iraq, Iran and Lebanon in the 1970s had studied at Najaf.

Najaf, alongside Karbala, is considered a thriving pilgrimage destination for Shia Muslims and the pilgrimage industry in the city boomed after the end of Saddam Hussein's rule. However, due to the U.S. sanctions on Iran, the number of Iranian pilgrims dropped significantly.

Geography
Climate
Najaf has a hot desert climate, BWh in the Köppen climate classification, with long, very hot summers and mild winters. The average annual temperature is 23.6 °C (74.5° F). The rainfall averages 69 mm (2.71 in).

See also

1977 Shia protests in Iraq
Al-Hannanah mosque
Al Najaf International Airport
Battle of Najaf (2003)
Battle of Najaf (2004)
Battle of Najaf (2007)
Big Four (Najaf)
Literary League Association

References

Further reading
Published in the 19th-20th centuries

Published in the 21st century

External links

Miracles in Najaf
The Holy City of Najaf (Iraq)
Interactive Guide: Najaf - The Guardian''

 
791 establishments
Cities in Iraq
District capitals of Iraq
Holy cities
Populated places established in the 8th century
Shia holy cities
Ali
Ziyarat